Music in the Air is a musical written by Oscar Hammerstein II (lyrics and book) and Jerome Kern (music). It introduced songs such as "The Song Is You", "In Egern on the Tegern See" and "I've Told Ev'ry Little Star". The musical premiered on Broadway in 1932, and followed the team's success with the musical Show Boat from 1927.

Productions
The original Broadway production opened at the Alvin Theatre on November 8, 1932, moved to the 44th Street Theatre on March 31, 1933 and closed on September 16, 1933 after 342 performances. It was directed by Jerome Kern and Oscar Hammerstein, and the cast included Reinald Werrenrath (Cornelius), Natalie Hall (Frieda Hatzfeld), Tullio Carminati (Bruno Mahler), Katherine Carrington (Sieglinde Lessing), Al Shean (Dr. Walter Lessing), Walter Slezak (Karl Reder), Nicholas Joy (Ernst Weber), and Marjorie Main (Anna). The music was orchestrated by Robert Russell Bennett.

The musical opened in the West End at His Majesty's Theatre on May 19, 1933 and ran for 199 performances.  The musical was staged at The Muny outdoor musical theatre, St. Louis, Missouri, in 1934, and again in 1937, 1944 and 1951.

The 1934 film version starred Gloria Swanson, John Boles, Douglass Montgomery, June Lang, and Al Shean. The director was Joe May, and the screenplay was by Howard Irving Young and Billy Wilder. It was released by Fox Film Corporation. The 1934 film, however, omitted the show's best-known number, The Song Is You. The song was filmed, but deleted from the final print.

A 1951 Broadway revival ran from October 8, 1951 through November 24, 1951 at the Ziegfeld Theatre. Directed by Oscar Hammerstein II, the cast featured Jane Pickens, Dennis King and Charles Winninger.  Because of possible anti-German feeling after World War II, Hammerstein changed the setting from Munich to Zurich with the resulting Swiss nationalities.

In 2009, Encores! at New York City Center presented a staged concert version of the show, starring Douglas Sills (Bruno Mahler), Sierra Boggess (Sieglinde Lessing), Dick Latessa (Herr Direktor Kirschner), Marni Nixon (Frau Direktor Kirschner), Ryan Silverman (Karl Reder) and Kristin Chenoweth (Frieda Hatzfeld, filling in for an originally announced Marin Mazzie). It ran from February 5 until February 8.

Principal characters
 Cornelius, a bird-seller
 Frieda Hatzfeld, an operetta star 
 Bruno Mahler, a composer
 Sieglinde Lessing, a young singer in love with Karl
 Dr Walther Lessing, Sieglinde's father, a composer and music teacher 
 Karl Reder, the local schoolteacher 
 Ernst Weber, publisher
 Lili Kirschner, wife of the producer

Synopsis
The musical takes place in Bavaria during the 1930s but some contemporary productions have modified it to present day.

In the simple mountain town of Edendorff in Bavaria, music teacher Dr. Walther Lessing has a beautiful daughter Sieglinde. She is in love with Karl Reder, the local schoolmaster. Karl and Sieglinde travel to the sophisticated city of Munich and try to get a song written by Walther and Karl published. Karl becomes enamored of glamorous operetta diva Frieda Hatzfeld while Sieglinde is smitten by Bruno Mahler, an operetta librettist with whom Frieda lives. Mahler wants Sieglinde to appear in his new work "Tingle-Tangle". Frieda moves out of Mahler's apartment and moves to an hotel where she can see Karl on a regular basis.

Bruno takes Sieglinde to the Munich zoo where Sieglinde is warned by Cornelius, a bird-seller, that as she and Karl are country people, it is not wise to stay in the big city. Sieglinde spurns an unwanted pass from Bruno while Frieda finds Karl equally unresponsive. Frieda plans to leave for Berlin to star in a new film. Before she leaves, she warns Karl that Bruno will cast Sieglinde aside as soon as he has used her. It is up to Karl to tell the producer of the show that Frieda has left. Bruno insists, to Karl's chagrin, that Sieglinde can take over the leading role in the operetta. Resulting from machinations of her father, and a somewhat chaotic dress rehearsal it becomes evident that Sieglinde is far too inexperienced to take on a leading role. As a result, Bruno's affections vanish. Walther and Sieglinde are told in no uncertain terms that the theatre is no place for amateurs and they should return to their home, and they do.

Frieda meanwhile has returned to take up the leading role and is an overwhelming success. Karl returns to Edendorff and to Sieglinde, both having learned a valuable lesson.

Musical numbers

Act I
Leit Motif
Prelude, Choral Song, and Inspiration - Dr. Lessing and Village Girls
Finaletto - Dr. Lessing, Sieglinde Lessing, and Karl Reder
The Town Crier
Interlude - Hans
Etude
Opening Dance - Two Children
Melodies of May/I've Told Ev'ry Little Star – Sieglinde Lessing, Karl Reder, and Choral Society
Prayer – Karl Reder, Sieglinde Lessing and Ensemble 
There's a Hill Beyond a Hill – Hans and Walking Club
The Walking Club
There's a Hill Beyond a Hill (Continued) – Walking Club
Pastoral
At Stony Brook (On the Road to Munich) - Sieglinde Lessing, Karl Reder, and Cornelius
The Vogelsanger
And Love Was Born - Cornelius
Impromptu
Scena (I Am So Eager) - Freida Hatzfeld
Pas Seul (Bubble Dance) - Hulde
I've Told Ev'ry Little Star (Reprise) – Sieglinde Lessing
Scene from Bruno's New Play "Tingle-Tangle"
Letter Song: I'm Coming Home – Bruno Mahler

Arietta: I'm Alone – Frieda Hatzfeld 

Duet: I Am So Eager - Frieda Hatzfeld and Bruno Mahler

Finaletto: I Am So Eager – Bruno Mahler, Frieda Hatzfeld and Ensemble
Terzetto: Finaletto Act I – Marthe, Ernst Weber and Dr. Walter Lessing

Act II
Sonata
Zoo Scene - Sieglinde Lessing, Bruno Mahler, and Cornelius
One More Dance – Bruno Mahler
Scena/Night Flies By – Sieglinde Lessing, Bruno Mahler, Frieda Hatzfeld, and Karl Reder
Finale to Zoo Scene: I've Told Every Little Star (Reprise) – Sieglinde Lessing
Nocturne
I'm Alone (Reprise) – Frieda Hatzfeld
Caprice
When the Spring Is in the Air – Sieglinde Lessing and Ensemble
In Egern on the Tegern See – Frau Direktor Kirschner
Finaletto - Sieglinde Lessing and Karl Reder
Dress Reherasal
Interlude - Stage Manager
Rhapsody
The Song Is You – Bruno Mahler
Intermezzo
Finaletto - Ernst, Uppman, Dr. Lessing, and Sieglinde Lessing
Humoresque
I'm Alone (Reprise) – Frieda Hatzfeld
The Song Is You (Reprise) – Frieda Hatzfeld and Bruno Mahler
Rondo
Finale: The Village of Edendorf (We Belong Together) – Karl Reder, Sieglinde Lessing, Cornelius and Company

References

External links
Internet Broadway Database listing for 1932 and 1951
Music in the Air synopsis and production information at guidetomusicaltheatre.com
"Background and analysis", Playbill, January  28, 2009

1932 musicals
Broadway musicals
Original musicals
Musicals by Oscar Hammerstein II
Musicals by Jerome Kern